Johannes Malvin Georgsson Eide, usually spelled Johs G. Eide (born 30 October 1937) is a Norwegian businessman, entrepreneur and shipbuilder. He is one of the founding owners, and former CEO of Eide Marine Services.

Early life and career 
Johannes Eide was born in Hоylandsbygd in 1937, as the second of six children. His father, Georg Eide Sr (1896-1951), was a shipbuilder, and ran a shipping plant not far from their home and Johannes inherited many of his father's boat building skills. In 1951, when Eide was two weeks shy of 14 years old, his father died suddenly, and so he left home to work to support his family. He returned four years later and formed his first company, Georg Eide's Sønner, with his brother Gerhard. The company specialized in shipbuilding, the craft that the two founders had learned from their father, and had their base on the same location as the old shipping plant. Eide ran this company until 1982, when he stepped down to take over the head position in Eide Contracting, one of the company's subsidiaries. The following year, Georg Eide's Sønner was declared bankrupt, following a series of economic problems.

Eide ran Eide Contracting until 1992, when the firm, along with its sister companies, was reorganized and renamed Eide Marine Services, which continues its operations today. During the 1970s and 1980s, he also ran a number of other companies, most of whom were subsidiaries of Eide Marine Services. He stepped down as CEO in the early 2000s (decade), with his son Georg Jr. taking over. He however continues to have an active role in the company, and still has his main office at the same location where he founded his first company more than fifty years ago.

Personal life 
Eide met his wife, Aud, at a young age and they married in 1964. They have five children of which the eldest, Georg Jr, runs the family business. He currently lives in his hometown of Høylandsbygd, where he continues to work with shipbuilding and local coastal culture and development.

In 2006, Eide was awarded the Royal Norwegian Order of St. Olav for his work to preserve the Norwegian shipbuilding and coastal history and culture, and for his work with the local environment and culture.

References

Norwegian businesspeople in shipping
1937 births
Living people